Heideweek is a week of festivities in Ede, Netherlands. Each year, the blossoming of the heath is celebrated. The people of Ede choose a heath queen and princess. A parade goes through the centre and suburbs of Ede, and festivities are scheduled for the Museum square area, including live music.

Festivals in the Netherlands
Ede, Netherlands
Tourist attractions in Gelderland